Mariano "Mar" Elepaño (born 1954) is a Filipino American independent filmmaker, teacher, and has been the production supervisor of the John C. Hench Division of Animation and Digital Arts, USC School of Cinematic Arts since 1993.

Elepaño was born and raised in the Philippines. He came to the United States to study film at the  USC School of Cinematic Arts in 1975.

Some of his short works of experimental animation (Lion Dance, Pendito, Winter, Burp, and Take 5) were screened at the Asian American International Film Festival, New York, New York July 27, 1989 and at Filmex: Los Angeles International Film Exposition (Short Film) March 14–30, 1979.
In addition, Winter was screened at the Contemporary Animation from Los Angeles Artists Festival in 2006. John Lent in Animation in Asia and the Pacific described Elepano as "the prime [Filipino] mover of computer animation" in the United States (p. 177).

Elepaño was a Fulbright Scholar in 2001. In 2007, he received a "California Council for the Humanities Grant Award to the Khmer Girls in Action (KGA)" which helped "teenage Cambodian American girls in the Long Beach [...] develop digital narratives about their identity and their connection or disconnection to their parents' generation."  He has also been conducting workshops for Visual Communications (VC), "a Los Angeles-based Asian American community media arts group since 1986."

Awards
2007 California Council for the Humanities Grant Award 
2003 Steve Tatsukawa Memorial Fund Award 
2002 USC School of Cinematic Arts Staff Achievement Award 
2001  Fulbright Award (Malaysia)

Publications
Labtalk in Moving the Image: Independent Asian Pacific American Media Arts, edited by Russell Leong. Los Angeles: UCLA Asian American Studies Center Press, 1992.

References
John A. Lent, ed. Animation in Asia and the Pacific, Bloomington, Indiana: Indiana University Press, 2001.
Tolento, Rolando B. "Identity and Difference in Filipino/A American Media Arts." In Screening Asian Americans edited by Peter X. Feng. New Brunswick, NJ: Rutgers University Press, 2002.

Notes

External links
Film Gallery
Faculty page -  USC School of Cinematic Arts
Faculty page -  Division of Animation and Digital Arts
Pixar's Future Plans Could Include Disney (Brief interview)

Living people
University of Southern California faculty
USC School of Cinematic Arts alumni
Filipino emigrants to the United States
American film directors of Filipino descent
1954 births